Nicolae Voicu (born 23 November 1955) is a Romanian middle-distance runner. He competed in the men's 3000 metres steeplechase at the 1980 Summer Olympics.

References

1955 births
Living people
Athletes (track and field) at the 1980 Summer Olympics
Romanian male middle-distance runners
Romanian male steeplechase runners
Olympic athletes of Romania
Place of birth missing (living people)